John Howard Allen was a U.S. politician, who was the second Mayor of Orlando from 1877 to 1878.

References

Mayors of Orlando, Florida
1845 births
Year of death missing